The 1988 Asian Judo Championships were held at Damascus, Syria in July.

Medal overview

Men's events

Women's events

Medals table

References
Judo Channel by Token Corporation
List of South Korean competitors for 1988 Asian Judo Championships, joins.com 1988.07.14

External links
 Judo Union of Asia

Asian Championships
Asian Judo Championships
International sports competitions hosted by Syria
Asian Judo Championships, 1988
20th century in Damascus
Sport in Damascus
Judo competitions in Syria